Voyeur is the debut album by American band Saint Motel, released on July 10, 2012, through OnThe Records. The album was recorded at the band's Los Angeles studio.

Reception 
Eric J. Lawrence of KCRW said of the album "They have attacked it with gusto on Voyeur, adding dynamic touches to their rock-solid core of songwriting" and that "Overall the album is a satisfying package from start to finish".

Mark Jenkins of The Washington Post reviewed the album, "Channeling British glam-pop as only a Los Angeles band can, Saint Motel makes chic and sprightly music with hints of ironic malevolence." He also said, "At times, the music can be almost too ecstatic, threatening to leave the listener behind."

Track listing

Personnel
A. J. Jackson – lead vocals, guitar, piano
Aaron Sharp – lead guitar
Greg Erwin – drums
Dak Lerdamornpong – bass

References

2012 albums
Saint Motel albums